Abroma is a genus in the family Malvaceae, with one or two species from Asia and Australia. Ambroma is an orthographic variant.

Taxonomy
The genus was described by Nikolaus Joseph von Jacquin in 1776 with a single species Abroma fastuosum, which was illustrated and described. However, because Jacquin was renaming Theobroma augusta L., according to the International Code of Nomenclature for algae, fungi, and plants, he was required to use the name Abroma augustum, and A. fastuosum is an illegitimate name. The correct name of the type species, A. augustum (L.) L. f., was made in 1782 by Carl Linnaeus the Younger.

Species
Abroma augustum (L.) L.f. – devil's cotton, bark a source of jute-like fibre
Abroma molle DC.

References

Byttnerioideae
Malvaceae genera